Elisabetta, regina d'Inghilterra (Elizabeth, Queen of England) is a dramma per musica or opera in two acts by Gioachino Rossini to a libretto by Giovanni Schmidt, from the play Il paggio di Leicester (Leicester's Page) by Carlo Federici, which itself "was derived from a novel The Recess (1785) by Sophia Lee."

It was premiered at the Teatro San Carlo in Naples on 4 October 1815 and was the first of nine operas which Rossini wrote for the San Carlo. Altogether, this was one of eighteen operas which he wrote during the time he spent in Naples.

Rossini took melodies from other operas to compose Elisabetta, including the overture, first written for Aureliano in Palmira, which is famous as the overture to The Barber of Seville.    As Holden notes, with the re-uses of earlier music, "it is as if Rossini wished to present himself to the Neapolitan public by offering a selection of the best music from operas unlikely to have been revived in Naples."

Some of Elisabettas music was recycled in later operas and a part of Elisabetta's first aria was re-used by Rossini four months later in Rosina's aria "Una voce poco fa" in the opera The Barber of Seville.

Performance history
The opera was first given in the UK on 30 April 1818 at the King's Theatre in London.

Notable performances include Palermo (1970),  Arles (1975), Teatro Regio di Torino, the Teatro San Carlo, Naples (1991), in New York (1998, given by Opera Northwest), at the Teatro Margarita Xirgu, Buenos Aires (2004), and at the Rossini Festival in Pesaro (2004).

Roles

Synopsis
Time: Reign of Elizabeth I
Place: London

Act 1
Throne Room of Whitehall Palace,

The Earl of Leicester is celebrating his victory over the Scots.  The Duke of Norfolk, who is also present, scowls with jealousy.  The Queen enters: (Aria: Quant'è grato all'alma mia).  Leicester is honored, and says he has brought home the sons of nobility as hostages.  However, he recognizes his wife, Matilda, and her brother, Enrico, as belonging to that group.

When they are alone, Leicester reproaches his wife (Duet: Incauta, che festi?).  Because she is the daughter of  Mary, Queen of the Scots, she is in danger.  Matilda tells Leicester  that the Queen loves him as well.   She mourns her ill fortune: (Aria: Sento un'interna voce).  Leicester decides that, to avoid suspicion, he will speak to neither Matilda nor to her brother, Enrico.

Royal apartments

Instead, Leicester tells Norfolk of his secret marriage and Norfolk, in turn, tells the Queen: (Duet: Perché mai, destin crudele). She reacts to the news in fury.

The hostages and Leicester are sent for.  The Queen offers to make him consort, and, upon his refusal, she accuses him of treason, and has both him and Matilda arrested.

Act 2
Rooms in the Palace

The Queen states that she has sentenced Matilda to death.  She demands that Matilda renounce her marriage to Leicester in return for his, her brother, Enrico's, and her own safety.  Leicester enters, tears the document up, and is once again arrested along with Matilda.  Also, the Queen banishes Norfolk for behaving badly towards Leicester.

Outside the Tower of London

People lament Leicester's upcoming execution.  Norfolk appears.  He induces the crowd to try to free Leicester.

Leicester's prison cell

He laments his fate.  Norfolk enters and convinces Leicester that he has begged the Queen to pardon him, instead of having betrayed him.  The Queen enters to see Leicester prior to his death.  Norfolk has hidden, and Matilda and Enrico are hiding as well.  Leicester tells the Queen that Norfolk has accused him.  Norfolk emerges with a dagger drawn to stab the Queen, when Matilda emerges and throws herself between them. The Queen condemns Norfolk to death, and, in the aria, Bell'alme generose, pardons Leicester and the Scottish prisoners.

Recordings

References
Notes

Sources
Gossett, Philip; Brauner, Patricia (2001), " Elisabetta, regina d'Inghilterra " in Holden, Amanda (ed.), The New Penguin Opera Guide, New York: Penguin Putnam. 
Kobbé, Gustave (1976), The New Kobbé's Complete Opera Book, NY:Putnam.  
Osborne, Charles (1994), The Bel Canto Operas of Rossini, Donizetti, and Bellini, Portland, Oregon: Amadeus Press.  
Osborne, Richard, Rossini (1990), Ithaca, New York: Northeastern University Press. 
Osborne, Richard (1998), "Elisabetta, regina d'Inghilterra", in  Stanley Sadie, (Ed.),  The New Grove Dictionary of Opera, Vol. Two. p. 2. London: Macmillan Publishers, Inc.   
Osborne, Richard and Philip Gossett, "Rossini, Gioachino", in The New Grove Dictionary of Opera, edited by Stanley Sadie. Grove Music Online at Oxford Music Online
Toye, Francis (re-issue 1987), Rossini: The Man and His Music, Dover Publications, 1987.   ,

External links
 Elisabetta, regina d’Inghilterra – Description of the critical edition published by the University of Chicago
 Plot description at the Rossini Opera Festival homepage

Italian-language operas
Operas by Gioachino Rossini
1815 operas
Operas
Operas set in England
Operas about Elizabeth I
Opera world premieres at the Teatro San Carlo
Operas based on plays